The Dalrymple-Hay Nature Reserve is a protected nature reserve that is located in the northerns suburbs of Sydney, New South Wales, Australia. The  reserve is situated in the suburb of St Ives,  from the Sydney central business district.

The reserve is the most significant remnant of the eucalyptus Blue Gum High Forest which dominated much of the shale based forests north of Sydney. Only 1% of the original forest remains. The reserve is a traditional part of the Aboriginal country, which stretched to the northern shores of Sydney Harbor to Broken Bay in the north.

Features
Average annual rainfall is a relatively high .

Bush regeneration programs have been implemented for many years. Invasive weeds such as privet, large leave privet, trad, lantana and camphor laurel continue to be troublesome.

Richard Dalrymple-Hay, proposed that this forest area should be preserved, in the 1920s. The area was originally part of the hunting grounds of the Kuringgai people. Dalrymple-Hay Nature Reserve is listed on the Register of the National Estate.

Flora 

180 native plants have been found in this reserve. Blackbutt is the dominant canopy species, other trees occurring include Sydney blue gum, grey ironbark, turpentine and rusty gum. Interesting smaller plants include false bracken, maytenus, downy chance and muttonwood.

Fauna 
Ringtail possums, sugar gliders, brushtail possums and grey-headed flying foxes are common. There are occasional sightings of wallabies. Birds such as rainbow lorikeets, Australian king parrots, crimson rosellas, currawongs, variegated wrens, black-faced cuckoo-shrikes, superb fairy wrens and silvereyes are some of the many birds found here.

See also

 Protected areas of New South Wales

References 

Forests of New South Wales
Nature reserves in Sydney
Protected areas established in 1972
1972 establishments in Australia
St Ives, New South Wales